Phi 1.618 (Bulgarian: ф 1.618) is a 2021 Bulgarian-Canadian dystopian science fiction adventure film directed by Theodore Ushev (in his directorial debut) and written by Vladislav Todorov. Starring Nikolay Stanoev, Deyan Donkov & Martina Apostolova. It is based on the novel The Spinning Top by Vladislav Todorov. The film was named on the shortlist for Bulgarian's entry for the Academy Award for Best International Feature Film at the 95th Academy Awards, but it was not selected. It was considered again when Mother was disqualified, but it was withdrawn from the director and the distributor, due to constant pressure from the other candidats and medias, that it is the "preelected" and "injust" sure entry.

Synopsis 
In a dystopian future, asexual, immortal men are created. The female sex to reproduce has therefore become redundant. As a poison spreads across the Earth, the loveless men set out to colonize the galaxy. On the spaceship they take the barely alive body of a woman with them, as a reminder of the past. While the calligrapher Krypton is busy creating a copy of the entire legacy of the Immortals, he comes across the irascible woman Gargara.

Cast 
The actors participating in this film are:

 Deyan Donkov as Krypton
 Martina Apostolova as Gargara
 Irmena Chichikova as Fia
 Nikolay Stanoev as Urungel

Release 
The film had its premiere in Bulgaria on October 8, 2022, at the Cinelibri International Book&Movie Festival and had its international premiere on October 13, 2022, at Festival du Nouveau Cinéma, in Canada.

Awards

References

External links 

 

2022 films
2022 science fiction films
2022 adventure films
Bulgarian science fiction films
Bulgarian adventure films
Canadian science fiction adventure films
2020s dystopian films
2020s Bulgarian-language films
Films set in Bulgaria
Films shot in Bulgaria
2022 directorial debut films
Films about immortality
Films about conquistadors